Graphium deliae is a butterfly in the family Papilionidae. It is found in Zambia.

References

deliae
Butterflies of Africa
Endemic fauna of Zimbabwe
Insects of Zimbabwe
Butterflies described in 2007